Portopalo di Capo Passero (Sicilian: Puortupalu) is a comune (municipality) in the Province of Syracuse, Sicily (Italy). The nearest city is Pachino with a population of nearly 10,000. Portopalo belonged to the municipality of Pachino until 1975 when it became an autonomous municipality itself. Portopalo is widely considered to have some of the best fishing that the Mediterranean area has to offer because of its location, connection of the Ionian and Mediterranean Seas and its temperate climate, which provides average temperatures between 14° and 25 °C.

Isola di Capo Passero 

The Isola di Capo Passero is a small island within a short swim of the shores of Portopalo. The primary attraction of the small island is il Fort di Capo Passero. Commissioned in 1599 by the crown of Spain, the fort lies on the highest point of the island of Capo Passero. Developed by Giovanni Antonio del Nobile, a German-sicilian architect, the fort was built to combat the dangers of severe and violent pirate activity in the Mediterranean region. Throughout the years, the fort remained a highly sought after naval resource as it was the guardian of the entrance to Europe. Whoever controlled the fort was considered to control the entrance to Europe. During the 18th century the fort was used as a military prison. However on December 30, 1866 a Royal Decree halted military prison activity in the fort. In 1871 a lighthouse was built in the terrace of the fort, which was operated by the Italian Navy until it was fully decommissioned in the late 1950s.

Chiesa di St. Gaetano 

The Church of San Gaetano has been built since 1927. The main prospect consists of a symmetrical body with regular stone guides; the two sides are topped by spikes. The top part is closed by the tympanum. The entrance portal is entirely made of shaped stone with side columns that support an arch-tympanum. The portal is surmounted by a circular window on the center axis with the front door. There are two terracotta pads on its side. The interior, single nave, has a semi-circular roof covering in canes and plaster; semicircular apse covered with cane also in canes and plaster. Laterally, on the right side, there is the SS chapel. Sacrament of quadrangular shape. Along the side walls, inside arches intertwined with stone pilasters, there are the niches hosting statues of saints. Above the cornices of the side walls open windows on both sides. The bell tower is located at the back of the building, on the left side and is accessed from the back-apse.

Port One Harbor 

Planning and design for the Port One harbor project has been initiated by Marina Sud, SRL. The harbor, set to begin construction in 2018, boasts 566 berths with spaces for boats of varying sizes to dock for both short term and long term stays. Also included is 24-hour security provided by both private and governmental sources, water, electricity, and maintenance services, 26 rental apartments, a shopping center, tourist center, and catamaran service to most major Mediterranean cities. Port One is slated to be the first of its kind: a true full-service harbor catering to the world's elite. Port One is expected to serve as an epicenter of Mediterranean travel and provide an ideal source of economic vitality and tourism revenue to the entire Sicilian and Mediterranean regions.

Castello Tafuri 

Built in 1935, Castello Tafuri is located on a rocky cliff on the south-eastern coast of Sicily, in front of the island of Capo Passero. It stands on a crystal blue sea and has for many years been the symbol of this small fishing center, today a destination for tourists and surfers.

The commissioner Franjo Bruno of Belmonte entrusted the realization of a villa in the form of a castle to the Florentine architect Crott. Severino Crott (Castiglion Fiorentino, 1886-1972), known for numerous expansions in the style of religious buildings in Tuscany, works for the first time in Sicily on the Castle. The project was drafted between 1933 and 1935 and work began that year. Eventually work was suspended and it remained that way for nearly two decades until 1957 when it was purchased by the Tafuri family. The Tafuri family transformed the property to a hotel facility in 1964 and expanded it between 1971 and 1972. In 1986 the property was leased to a third party where it remained until its closing in 1998. In 2016, the hotel re-opened under the Tafuri name and remains in operation.

History

General 
The name Portopalo comes from the Latin Portus Palus, that means porto palude(marshy harbour), and in 1975 the words Capo Passero have been added to distinguish it from the homonymous Porto Palo in the province of Agrigento.

Portopalo has historically been a predominantly agricultural and fishing town, and in addition to tourism, the economic activity remains in these industries. On the eastern shore of the municipalities lies the Island of Capo Passero where the Spanish Fort still stands to this day.

World War II 
Portopalo is widely considered the location where the liberation of Italy from German occupation in World War II was initiated. On July 10, 1943, after taking control of Northern Africa, American, British and Commonwealth allied troops arrived on the shores near Gela and Pachino (Portopalo) in an attempt to attain control over the eastern portion of Italy. Eastern Italy had been controlled by Nazi Germany and the allied troops were aware that taking control of the island of Sicily would enable them to liberate the whole of Italy from German control. Military actions in Sicily ended on August 17, 1943, with Italy signing an unconditional armistice with the Allied forces on September 8 of that year.

1996 Shipping Disaster 
In the early hours of December 26, 1996, a fishing vessel F174 carrying more than 300 South Asian migrants sank off the coast of Sicily and 283 of them drowned.

The catastrophe happened when the Yohan, a merchant ship carrying the migrants from Greece, approached the Sicilian coast and nearly three hundred people were transferred from the freighter to a fishing boat that measured . During the operation the two vessels collided and the fishing vessel sank.

For most of the following years the disaster was considered nothing more than a ghost story. Harbor officials and fishermen from the port of Portopalo kept silent and the Italian government denied the tragedy ever took place, and refused to accept the testimonies of survivors.

Salvatore Lupo, a local fisherman, began speaking out about the accident in 2001 after he found a victim’s identification card in his fishing net. He then helped a journalist, Giovanni Mario Bellu working for La Repubblica, locate the wreck with an underwater robot equipped with cameras.

Demographic evolution

Geography
Portopalo di Capo Passero borders the following municipalities: Pachino.

Climate
The Köppen Climate Classification subtype for this climate is "Csa" (Mediterranean Climate).

References

External links

Cities and towns in Sicily
Municipalities of the Province of Syracuse
Populated coastal places in Italy